Bill Duckworth (10 June 1918 – 24 October 2016) was an Australian rules footballer who played with Collingwood in the Victorian Football League (VFL).

Notes

External links 
		
Bill Duckworth's profile at Collingwood Forever

1918 births
2016 deaths
Australian rules footballers from Victoria (Australia)
Collingwood Football Club players